The West Kirk (since 2015 called Helensburgh Parish Church) is a Church of Scotland parish church on Colquhoun Square in Helensburgh, Argyll, Scotland. Designed by James Hay, in 1853, it is designated as a Category B listed building by Historic Environment Scotland.

In 2011 the church united with St Columba Church to become St Andrew's Kirk. The St Columba Church building became The Tower arts centre.

In 2015 St Andrew's Kirk united with Park Church to become Helensburgh Parish Church. In 2016 the Park Church building became the Buddhist Meditation Centre of Scotland.

Since December 2015 the Parish Minister is the Reverend David T. Young BA, BD Min (Hons), MTh, RNR.

References

External links
 Official website

Category B listed buildings in Argyll and Bute
Helensburgh
Listed churches in Scotland
Churches in Argyll and Bute
Churches completed in 1853
19th century in Scotland
Helensburgh